Gynnidomorpha julianiensis is a species of moth of the family Tortricidae. It is found in China (Guizhou, Hunan, Jiangxi).

The wingspan is 10−12 mm.

References

Moths described in 1991
Cochylini